In algebraic geometry, given a category C, a categorical quotient of an object X with action of a group G is a morphism  that
(i) is invariant; i.e.,  where  is the given group action and p2 is the projection.
(ii) satisfies the universal property: any morphism  satisfying (i) uniquely factors through .
One of the main motivations for the development of geometric invariant theory was the construction of a categorical quotient for varieties or schemes.

Note  need not be surjective. Also, if it exists, a categorical quotient is unique up to a canonical isomorphism. In practice, one takes C to be the category of varieties or the category of schemes over a fixed scheme. A categorical quotient  is a universal categorical quotient if it is stable under base change: for any ,  is a categorical quotient.

A basic result is that geometric quotients (e.g.) and GIT quotients (e.g.) are categorical quotients.

References 
  Mumford, David; Fogarty, J.; Kirwan, F. Geometric invariant theory. Third edition. Ergebnisse der Mathematik und ihrer Grenzgebiete (2) (Results in Mathematics and Related Areas (2)), 34. Springer-Verlag, Berlin, 1994. xiv+292 pp.

See also 
Quotient by an equivalence relation
Quotient stack

Algebraic geometry